Point Alison is a summer village in Alberta, Canada. It is located on the northern shore of Wabamun Lake, and south of the Village of Wabamun.

Demographics 

In the 2016 Census of Population conducted by Statistics Canada, the Summer Village of Point Alison had a population of 10 living in 6 of its 31 total private dwellings, a  change from its 2011 population of 15.

The Summer Village of Point Alison's 2013 municipal census counted a population of 10, a  change from its 2010 municipal census population of 6.

See also 
List of communities in Alberta
List of summer villages in Alberta
List of resort villages in Saskatchewan

References

External links 

1950 establishments in Alberta
Edmonton Metropolitan Region
Summer villages in Alberta